Buck Goldstein (born March 11, 1948 in Atlanta, Georgia) is the Entrepreneur in residence and a Professor of Practice in the Department of Economics at the University of North Carolina at Chapel Hill. He is the co-author of the book Engines of Innovation – The Entrepreneurial University in the 21st Century, in which he contends that the world’s biggest problems can be effectively addressed by large research universities through a combination of skillful innovation and execution.  He was named Entrepreneur of the Year by the Information Industry Association and Information America, the company he cofounded, has appeared numerous times on the Inc. 500 list of fastest growing companies.

Education
Goldstein attended public school in Miami Beach, Florida and graduated from Miami Beach Senior High School in 1966.  He received his B.A. with Honors from the University of North Carolina at Chapel Hill in 1970 where he was elected to Phi Beta Kappa and the Order of the Golden Fleece.  He received a M.Ed. from the University of Massachusetts in 1973 and a J.D. with Honors from the University of North Carolina at Chapel Hill in 1976, where he served on the editorial board of the North Carolina Law Review.

Goldstein never enrolled in a business course during his undergraduate or graduate career. The first time he attended a formal business class was when he spoke to a marketing class at the UNC Kenan-Flagler Business School about his success as an entrepreneur.

Entrepreneurship
Buck Goldstein has been involved in entrepreneurship most of his professional life.  After four years of working at a corporate law firm, he co-founded Information America, an online information company that was the first to make courthouse information available from remote terminals in lawyer’s offices.  The business began as a two-person start-up and grew to over $40,000,000 in revenues, eventually going public and trading on the NASDAQ.  Customers included virtually every major law firm in the United States, most of the Fortune 500 and many large federal agencies including the FBI, the DEA and the CIA.   In 1994, Information America was acquired by West Publishing, the largest legal publisher in the world and soon after was acquired by Thomson Corporation, a multi-national information publishing company.

He later founded NetWorth Partners, a venture capital fund focusing on information based enterprises with Mellon Ventures as its largest investor and subsequently became a partner in Mellon Ventures, a subsidiary of Mellon Bank.   As a partner, Goldstein invested in a number of emerging businesses and served on the Board of Directors of over 15 companies.

More recently, Goldstein served as Chairman of MedFusion, a Raleigh-based medical information technology company acquired by Intuit in 2010, and as Board Observer and advisor for iContact, an email marketing company based in the Research Triangle Park acquired by Vocus in 2012.  Additionally, Goldstein has served as an advisor to Liquidia, a nano-technology company founded in the UNC chemistry department, and as a board member of Nourish International, a non-profit organization that engages college students across the United States in on campus social businesses  and international poverty reduction projects.

Over the years, Goldstein has served on boards in a variety of capacities, including chairman of the Institute of Arts and Humanities advisory board at UNC-Chapel Hill, president of the Atlanta Chapter of the American Jewish Committee, and board member of the High Museum of Art in Atlanta.

Goldstein joined the university faculty at the University of North Carolina at Chapel Hill in 2004 to help build The Carolina Entrepreneurial Initiative, a project to make a broad definition of entrepreneurship part of the intellectual culture of the campus and support students and faculty to turn innovative ideas into self-sustaining enterprises.   The UNC entrepreneurship curriculum has been named by a variety of national publications as among the nation’s best. Goldstein recruits alumni and other university supporters with entrepreneurial expertise to serve as mentors for faculty and student projects and to provide off-campus internships for students. As Professor of the Practice at the university, he teaches both small seminars and large lecture courses in entrepreneurship and supports the continuing development of the undergraduate Minor in Entrepreneurship and its internship program.

"I want to make entrepreneurship a part of the fabric of the university," Goldstein said in an interview, "We want to develop both business and social entrepreneurs. We want to give students and faculty members the tools to turn ideas into reality."

Goldstein and Chancellor Holden Thorp co-authored Engines of Innovation – The Entrepreneurial University in the 21st Century, suggesting that the top 125 U.S. research universities can play a crucial role in revitalizing the American economy.  Goldstein and Thorp are also working to transform UNC, a 29,000-student public university, into an engine of innovation.

Awards
Featured on Inc 500 list of rapidly-growing businesses
Featured in "Who’s Who in Technology" Atlanta Business Chronicle, 22 October 2001
Entrepreneur of the Year Award, Information Industry Association and Information America, 1991
Fast Tech 50, Arthur Andersen LLP, Atlanta, 1988

External links 
Video: Vimeo Interview with Holden Thorp and Buck Goldstein. April 18, 2011
Video: TEDx Ashoka U 2011: Buck Goldstein and Holden Thorp. TEDx. May 5, 2011

Further reading
Jane Paige. “Entrepreneurs lending hand at Duke, NCSU, UNC.” Triangle Business Journal. March 7, 2005.
Phillip Manning. “Advancing science with big teams, big money.” News&Observer. October 3, 2010.
Gene Marks. “This Week in Small Business: Taxes, Bankers, the Windows Phone.” New York Times Small
Business. October 18, 2010
Katyayani Jhaveri. “Buck Goldstein Talks Innovation.” Daily Tar Heel. March 9, 2011
Dale Gibson. “Entrepreneurism lures Thorp back to UNC Classroom.” Triangle Business Journal. January 13, 2012
Tori Stilwell. "N.C. colleges nurture Generation Z entrepreneurs." News&Observer. February 5, 2012
David Rohde. “The university as job laboratory.” Reuters. February 9, 2012

References 

1948 births
Living people
21st-century American businesspeople
People from Chapel Hill, North Carolina
University of North Carolina at Chapel Hill faculty
University of North Carolina at Chapel Hill alumni
American business writers
Miami Beach Senior High School alumni
American economics writers